Maria Aparecida Borghetti, commonly known as Cida Borghetti is a Brazilian public administrator, businesswoman and politician,  serving as governor of the state of Paraná from 6 April 2018 until January 1, 2019, being the first woman to hold this position.

Personal life
Borghetti is the daughter of Ires Anna Borghetti and Severino Ivo Borghetti. She is married to Health Minister Ricardo Barros, with whom she has a daughter, Maria Victoria Barros, who was elected as a state deputy in the 2014 elections.
Maria's wedding in 2017 was disturbed by protesters who were angry at her political position. Borghetti and her husband were there when the bride had to be protected from thrown eggs.

References

|-

1965 births
Living people
Governors of Paraná (state)
People from Santa Catarina (state)
Members of the Legislative Assembly of Paraná
Progressistas politicians
Women state governors of Brazil